The South African national cricket team toured Australia in the 1997-98 season.  They played 3 test matches. Australia won the Test series 1-0.

South Africa also competed in a Carlton and United Series with Australia and New Zealand they won 7 of their 8 round robin matches but lost the best of three final 2-1 to Australia despite having won the first 'final'.

Test series summary

1st Test

2nd Test

3rd Test

External sources 
 CricketArchive

References 
 Wisden Cricketers Almanack 

1997 in Australian cricket
1997 in South African cricket
1997–98 Australian cricket season
1998 in Australian cricket
1998 in South African cricket
International cricket competitions from 1997–98 to 2000
1997-98